Automotive Research Association of India (ARAI) is co-operative industrial research association by the automotive industry with the Ministry of Industries, Government Of India The objectives of the Association are Research and Development in automotive engineering for industry, product design and development, evaluation of automotive equipment and ancillaries, standardisation, technical information services, execution of advanced courses on the application of modern technology and conduct of specific tests.

The Automotive Research Association of India, (ARAI) is located in the western part of Pune, Maharashtra. The  of land houses various laboratories, test facilities spread over 8343 m2 of area. It is well connected by air, rail and road about 25 km from Pune Airport and 12 km from the railway station. The Institute has been set up by the Indian Vehicle and automotive ancillary manufacturers and the (Government of India), Ministry of Industry, as a co-operative industrial research body to provide services to the industry in the fields of applied research and product development in automotive engineering.

It is also responsible for car mileage figure for every car sold in India. ARAI claims to be the first Indian institute to develop HCNG fuel engine.

History
ARAI established in 1966 is located at Pune, India. 150 km from Mumbai It was incorporated as Industrial Research Organisation formed by the Indian Automotive Industry, affiliated to the Ministry of Industry, Government of India. The Institute is registered as a Society under the Societies Registration Act XXI of 1860.

Automotive research
In order to meet the development requirements of Industry, several facility and competence build-up projects have been completed. Most notable amongst these are Engine Design/Simulation Software Installation, development of bi-fuel CNG kits, new techniques and software capabilities in Noise, Vibration, Harshness Analysis as well as Vehicle Crash Analysis and VDACS software for chassis dynamometer control. Amongst the new facilities added are the Particulate Measurement System and most modern Digitally Controlled Load Simulation. ARAI has also developed a Simulation Lab, offering end to end solutions to the automotive industry as well as allied non-automotive industries.

It is the first automotive engineering R&D institute in India to be awarded ISO 9001 Quality System Certification, ISO 14001 Environmental System Certification & OHSAS 18001 Occupational Health & Safety Certification.

Research & Development Divisions
AED : Automotive Electronics Department
ERL : Environmental Research Laboratory
CAE : Computer Aided Engineering
FID : Forging Industry Division
NVH : Noise, Vibration & Harshness
PTE : Power Train Engineering
SDL : Structural Dynamics Laboratory
Homologation Divisions
ECL : Emission Certification Laboratory
HMR : Homologation & Management Regulation
HTC : Homologation and Technology Center
SHL : Safety & Homologation Laboratory
PSL : Passive Safety Laboratory
VEL : Vehicle Evaluation Laboratory
Support Divisions
BDCP : Business Development & Corporate Planning
CAL : Calibration
CMC : Central Maintenance Cell
F&A : Finance & Accounts
HRMA : Human Resources, Management & Administration
ID : Infrastructure Development
ITM : Information Technology Management
KC : Knowledge Centre
PMD : Prototype Manufacturing Department
QMD : Quality Management Department

See also
Automotive Industry Standards
International Centre for Automotive Technology
NATRiP

References

Government agencies established in 1966
Research institutes in Pune
Automotive industry in India
Business organisations based in India
1966 establishments in Maharashtra